Aidan Fitzpatrick (born 20 March 2001) is a Scottish professional footballer who plays as a winger for Partick Thistle and has previously played for Norwich City and Queen of the South.

Club career

Partick Thistle (first spell)
From Partick in Glasgow, Fitzpatrick started playing football at St Peters Primary School. He was recommended to Partick Thistle and progressed through the club's youth system.

Fitzpatrick debuted for the first-team versus Albion Rovers in the 2018–19 Scottish League Cup in July 2018, coming on as a substitute and scoring a goal in the 2–0 win. He was the first player born in the 21st century to play for Partick Thistle. On his first starting appearance versus Stranraer in the 2018–19 Scottish Challenge Cup, Fitzpatrick scored two goals and had an assist in a 5–0 victory, winning an Irn-Bru Golden Balls award. He signed a new long-term contract in September 2018. 
Thistle confirmed in January 2019 that the club had received two bids for Fitzpatrick, one in the summer of 2018 and one in January 2019, however, both bids were turned down.

Fitzpatrick scored his first league goal for Partick Thistle in the 2–1 away win to Inverness Caledonian Thistle in February 2019. The following month, he scored a stoppage time winner for Thistle in a 2–1 home win over Dundee United.

Norwich City
On 5 July 2019, Fitzpatrick signed for Premier League club Norwich City for a fee reported to be in the region of £350,000.

Queen of the South
On 24 August 2020, Fitzpatrick signed for Scottish Championship club Queen of the South in a season-long loan deal. On 8 September 2021, after securing his contract release from Norwich, he signed a one-year permanent contract with Queen of the South.

Partick Thistle (second spell)
On 13 July 2022, Fitzpatrick signed a two-year deal with Partick Thistle once again. Although his contract at previous club Queen of the South had expired, the Doonhamers held out for a compensation fee, due to the player still being under 23 years old.

Career statistics

References

External links

Living people
2001 births
Footballers from Glasgow
Association football wingers
Partick Thistle F.C. players
Scottish Professional Football League players
Scottish footballers
Norwich City F.C. players
People from Partick
Scotland youth international footballers
Queen of the South F.C. players